James Hofford (born October 4, 1964) is a former professional ice hockey defenceman. Born in Sudbury, Ontario, Hofford was drafted in the sixth round, 114th overall, by the Buffalo Sabres in the 1983 NHL Entry Draft.  He played eighteen games in the National Hockey League: seventeen with the Sabres and one with the Los Angeles Kings.  He was scoreless for his NHL career, but is a member of the Rochester Americans hall of fame.

Hofford has been the general manager of The Mall at Greece Ridge since 1998.

Career statistics

References

External links

1964 births
Living people
Buffalo Sabres draft picks
Buffalo Sabres players
Canadian ice hockey defencemen
Ice hockey people from Ontario
Los Angeles Kings players
Rochester Americans players
Sportspeople from Greater Sudbury
Windsor Spitfires players